The  is an anti-revisionist Marxist–Leninist communist party in Japan that was founded in 1980 by former members of the Japan Communist Party (Marxist–Leninist).

References

External links 
 日本共産党（行動派）
 日本人民戦線

1980 establishments in Japan
Communist parties in Japan
Anti-revisionist organizations
Stalinist parties
Maoist parties
Far-left politics in Japan
Political parties established in 1980
Maoism in Asia